Thomas Argyll Robertson  (27 October 1909 – 10 May 1994), known as "Tommy" or by his initials as "TAR", was a Scottish MI5 intelligence officer responsible during the Second World War for the "Double-Cross" ("XX") disinformation campaign against the German intelligence services. Included in this was Operation Mincemeat.

The disinformation campaign was successful in persuading the Germans that the invasions of Sicily (1943) and Normandy (D-Day) (6 June 1944) were going to occur elsewhere.

Earlier in 1936, Robertson oversaw the interception of telephone calls of Edward VIII, in which capacity he was the first to learn of the king's decision to abdicate.

References 

Officers of the Order of the British Empire
1909 births
1994 deaths
MI5 personnel
Double-Cross System
Abdication of Edward VIII